Lienert Cosemans (born ) is a Belgian male volleyball player. He is part of the Belgium men's national volleyball team. On club level he plays for VBC Waremme.

References

External links
 profile at FIVB.org

1993 births
Living people
Belgian men's volleyball players
Place of birth missing (living people)